The Dominican Summer League Padres or DSL Padres are a Rookie League affiliate of the San Diego Padres based in the Dominican Republic. They play in the Dominican Summer League. As an independent affiliate, they have been in existence since 1997.

History
The team first came into existence in 1990, when they shared an affiliation with the Detroit Tigers and the Boston Red Sox and were known as the DSL Tigers/Padres/Red Sox.

For the 1991 season, they shared an affiliation with the California Angels and Los Angeles Dodgers and were called the DSL Angels/Dodgers/Padres.

For 1992 and 1993, the team shared an affiliation with the New York Yankees and were known as the DSL Yankees/Padres.

The next three seasons (1994–1996), the team shared an affiliation with the Chicago Cubs and were called the DSL Cubs/Padres.

They have been independently affiliated with the Padres since 1997.

Roster

References

Baseball teams established in 1997
San Diego Padres minor league affiliates
Dominican Summer League teams
Baseball teams in the Dominican Republic
1997 establishments in the Dominican Republic